The RBX Files is the debut album by American rapper RBX, released September 26, 1995, on Premeditated/Warner Bros. Records. It peaked at number 12 on the Billboard Top R&B/Hip-Hop Albums and at number 62 on the Billboard 200. The album was produced by Greg "Gregski" Royal.

Along with singles, music videos were released for two songs: "A.W.O.L." and "Rough Is the Texture."

Background 
Following his guest appearances on The Chronic and Doggystyle, RBX was tagged to be Death Row’s next big star, but that was not to be—Dr. Dre and Suge Knight pushed back his debut, and he wound up leaving the label and putting out the album on Premeditated Records.

Reception 

AllMusic — "Many of the hip-hoppers who heard RBX's cameos on Dr. Dre's The Chronic and Snoop Dogg's Doggystyle recognized the L.A. rapper's potential and asked, "When will this guy have an album of his own out?" But regrettably, RBX's first solo album, The RBX Files, ended up being delayed a few years because of the MC's problems with Dre and Snoop, both of whom he vehemently attacks on the single "A.W.O.L."..."

Option (1-2/96, p. 111)—"The RBX Files is subtly funky (with) expertly paced backing tracks."

Track listing

Chart history

References

External links 
 The RBX Files at Discogs
 The RBX Files at MusicBrainz
 The RBX Files at Tower Records

1995 debut albums
RBX albums
G-funk albums
Warner Records albums